Robert Oliver (born 14 January 1988, in Birmingham) is a British Paralympic canoeist. He won bronze in the Men's Kayak Single 200m - KL3 at the 2020 Summer Paralympics in Tokyo.

References

External links
 

1988 births
Living people
British male canoeists
Paracanoeists of Great Britain
Paralympic bronze medalists for Great Britain
Paralympic medalists in paracanoe
Paracanoeists at the 2020 Summer Paralympics
Medalists at the 2020 Summer Paralympics
Sportspeople from Birmingham, West Midlands